Michael Madana Kama Rajan is a 1990 Indian Tamil-language comedy film directed by Singeetam Srinivasa Rao and written by Kamal Haasan, with Crazy Mohan penning the dialogues. The film stars Haasan in four roles alongside Urvasi, Rupini and Khushbu, while Manorama, Delhi Ganesh, Nassar, Vennira Aadai Moorthy, S. N. Lakshmi, Jayabharathi, R. N. Jayagopal, Nagesh, Praveen Kumar and Santhana Bharathi, R. S. Shivaji play supporting roles. It revolves around quadruplets who get separated at birth and cross paths as adults.

Panchu Arunachalam obtained the rights to adapt a Pakistani film written by Kader Kashmiri. Despite retaining that film's core premise of quadruplets, Rao, Haasan and Mohan created an otherwise entirely new story. The film was produced by Arunachalam's wife Meena, photographed primarily by B. C. Gowrishankar and edited by D. Vasu.

Michael Madana Kama Rajan was released on 17 October 1990, Diwali day, and was commercially successful, running for 175 days, thereby becoming a silver jubilee film.

Plot 

Venugopal, a wealthy industrialist, marries a woman and they have quadruplets. His brother Nandagopal tries to have her and the babies killed by hired goons. Alex, the leader of the goons, refuses to kill the babies, so he adopts one (Michael), leaves one in an orphanage (Subramaniam Raju), one in a temple (Kameshwaran) who is adopted by a cook Palakkad Mani Iyer, and one (Madanagopal) in a car that belongs to Venugopal.

30 years later, Madan is a London-educated businessman. Venugopal has raised Madan as his adopted son, unaware that he is his biological son. Venugopal is seemingly killed by Nandagopal and his nephew, Ramu for his inheritance; unknown to them, the will has already named Madan as the beneficiary. Madan returns to Bangalore from London to take over his father's company. He confronts Avinashi, his father's PA, over his embezzlement, while reluctantly promising to forgive him if Avinashi accepted his culpability.

In Madras, Michael and Alex run a counterfeit money racket. While they escape from the police, Michael accidentally causes a fire in an art gallery. Raju, a firefighter, saves the artist Shalini and her paintings, leading to romance. Kameshwaran, a vegetarian cook for weddings, meets Thirupurasundari alias "Thirupu" and her grandmother in a wedding. Eventually, Kameshwaran marries Thirupu.

Someone contacts Madan over phone and tells him that his father's death was no accident, but planned, and asks him to meet her in Madras. After some distractions involving a theatre artist Chakkubai and her mother Gangabai, Madan meets the caller, Sushila, unaware she is his biological mother. While escaping from goons sent by Ramu, Madan meets Raju and hires him to take leave from firefighting and to impersonate him in Bangalore while Madan investigates in Madras. In exchange, Madan pays off Raju's loans.

Meanwhile, Ramu and Nandagopal have hired Michael to kill Madan. Michael sabotages Madan's car, not realising it is Raju. The brakes fail on the highway, but Raju brings the car to a safe stop. Sushila meets with him thinking he is Madan, but he redirects her to the real Madan in Madras. Raju, Shalini, and her father arrive at Madan's house in Bangalore. Raju confiscates back Avinashi's money, unaware of Madan's deal with Avinashi.

Meanwhile, Michael finds the real Madan in Madras. Madan and Chakkubai have fallen in love. Michael and Alex spy on them. Michael follows Madan, Chakkubai, Gangubai, and Sushila to Sushila's house where it is revealed that Madan's father is alive but dazed from the assassination attempt. Michael and Alex arrive at the scene. Sushila recognises Alex as the man who had taken her quadruplets and realises that Michael and Madan are her sons. Michael and Alex knock them out and kidnap Madan and the others to a mountain cabin near Bangalore.

Avinashi chances upon Kameshwaran on his wedding day, and hires him to impersonate Madan to retrieve the confiscated money. Back in Madan's house in Bangalore, Raju and Shalini plan to meet without her father knowing. Avinashi drugs Raju's soup, thinking Raju is Madan, but Madan's bodyguard Bheem drinks it. Raju and Shalini meet and profess their love for one another. Michael and Alex arrive at Madan's house to loot it. Michael sees Raju, mistakes him for Madan, and thinks that Madan has escaped from the cabin. He knocks Raju unconscious. Avinashi sees the unconscious Raju, assumes it was the effect of his drugged soup, and brings Kameshwaran in.

Kameshwaran is mistaken for Raju by Shalini who then tries to get intimate with him. Thirupu and her grandmother drag Kameshwaran away from her. Shalini then witnesses Kameshwaran hugging Thirupu. This angers her as she thinks it is Raju. Chakkubai and Gangubai also arrive at the house in search of Madan. Chakkubai mistakes Kameshwaran for Madan and introduces herself to everyone as Madan's lover. Shalini takes a rifle and holds everyone at gunpoint. Avinashi and the rest try to tell her that Kameshwaran is not Madan or Raju but she does not believe them.

Meanwhile, the real Madan has escaped the cabin with his parents and comes to the house. Amidst all this confusion, Michael steals Madan's wealth and escapes to the cabin. Everyone else follows them back to the cabin in multiple cars. Ramu and Nandagopal are already present in the cabin and hold everyone at gunpoint as they arrive . All four brothers are finally in the same room at the same time and Sushila tells them that they are her sons. The presence of all the people in the small cabin causes it to tilt over the cliff edge. The goons are knocked out and the four brothers work together to safely get everyone out of the cabin.

Cast 

 Kamal Haasan as Michael, Madanagopal, Kameshwaran and Subramaniam Raju
 Urvashi as Thiripurasundari
 Rupini as Chakku Bai
 Khushbu as Shalini Sivaraman
 Nagesh as Avinasi
 Vennira Aadai Moorthy as Sivaraman
 Nassar as Ramu
 Manorama as Gangabai
 Jayabharathi as Sushila
 S. N. Lakshmi as Thiripurasundari's grandmother
 Delhi Ganesh as Palakkad Mani Iyer

 Santhana Bharathi as Alex
 R. S. Shivaji as David
 R. N. K. Prasad as Venugopal
 R. N. Jayagopal as Nandagopal
 Crazy Mohan as the provisions store owner
 Ananthu as a car driver
 Ponnambalam as an assassin
 Venkatesh as an assassin
 Gopinath Rao as Varadhu Kutty
 Mayilsamy as Raju's colleague/friend
 Praveen Kumar as Bheem
 Singeetam Srinivasa Rao as the travelling singer (uncredited)

Production

Development 
The producer/writer Panchu Arunachalam saw a Pakistani film written by Kader Kashmiri featuring quadruplets being separated at birth and reuniting in the climax. He obtained the rights to adapt that film in Tamil, with Singeetam Srinivasa Rao hired to direct, the screenplay written by Kamal Haasan and the dialogues by Crazy Mohan. While the film retained the original's core premise and Kashmiri received credit for the story, the team of Rao, Haasan and Mohan created an otherwise entirely new story. The film was initially titled Jolly Jag Jeevan Ram, but no one liked it. Mohan suggested Madana Kama Rajan, inspired by the 1941 film of the same name, which Haasan agreed to but felt it was not inclusive; at his suggestion, Mohan added "Michael". As Haasan did not like spending time to establish the premise, the opening montage song "Kadha Kelu Kadha Kelu" was conceived to do the same.

Haasan said he wrote the script of Michael Madana Kama Rajan "like a kolam that you teach a child. There were just a few dots and crosses. Mohan was the only one who truly got it." He said the story has its origin in Oscar Wilde's play The Importance of Being Earnest. The film was produced by Arunachalam's wife Meena under P. A. Art Productions, cinematography was handled primarily by B. C. Gowrishankar, and editing by D. Vasu.

Casting 
Haasan played four distinct characters who are quadruplets: the criminal Michael, the businessman Madanagopal, the cook Kameshwaran and the firefighter Subramaniam Raju. To portray each quadruplet, Haasan sported different looks; for Michael, he grew his hair long and had a French beard; for Madan, he wore glasses and was clean-shaven; for Kameshwaran (also clean-shaven), he brushed his hair back and applied a vibhuti tilaka on his forehead; for Raju, he kept his moustache thick and hair short. In keeping with the quadruplets' diverse upbringings, he even had different speaking styles for each quadruplet: a "gruff" accent for Michael, an English one for Madan, a Palakkad one for Kameshwaran, and Madras Bashai for Raju. As Coimbatore was then a hub for numerous counterfeit money scams, Haasan added this to Michael's characterisation.

Urvashi played Kameshwaran's love interest Thirupurasundari, this being her second Tamil film after Mundhanai Mudichu (1983). She dubbed in her own voice at Haasan's insistence. Khushbu was cast as Raju's love interest Shalini after a meeting with Arunachalam's son Subbu. Rupini played Madan's love interest Chakku Bai. According to Haasan, all three actresses would be "squeamish about what would be their part and we couldn't take any more of it", hence a love interest for Michael was not created.

Nagesh initially wanted to play a different role from Madan's PA Avinashi, but when Haasan asked him if he would play his role, Nagesh retorted, "As if you'd give me that if I asked you for it!" He was interested in playing Thirupurasundari's kleptomaniac grandmother before S. N. Lakshmi was cast. Vennira Aadai Moorthy, who played Shalini's father Shivaraman, added "his own quirks" to the role. Haasan cast Praveen Kumar as Madan's bodyguard after being impressed with his performance as Bhima in the TV series Mahabharat; the bodyguard was named Bheem as a reference to the earlier role. Delhi Ganesh, who played Kameshwaran's foster father Mani Iyer, also used a Palakkad accent for his character. Santhana Bharathi was cast as Michael's foster father Alex after Haasan recommended him to Rao.

Filming 
The song "Sundhari Neeyum Sundharan Njanum" was filmed entirely in slow-motion at 48 frames per second. Rao initially wanted the picturisation with 20 widows in background, but changed the idea after hearing the tune of the song. The song "Rum Bum Bum Arambum" was choreographed by Prabhu Deva. In a scene set in Madan's house where many characters confront each other, they cunningly try to evade Michael when held by him at gunpoint; it was not written in the script that they should do so, but improvised during filming at Haasan's suggestion.

The climax sequence, featuring a "cliff-hanging-house", was based on a similar scene from the American film The Gold Rush (1925). The exterior portion was shot in Coonoor and the interior of the house was shot in studio, in a hydraulic set. Kabir Lal was selected as cinematographer for the climax sequence due to the complexities involved with shooting multiple lookalikes. Due to his rapport with Panchu Arunachalam, Santhana Bharathi was allowed to aid post-production works such as dubbing and re-recording.

Themes and influences 
Haasan has acknowledged various films as influences on Michael Madana Kama Rajan, namely Nadodi Mannan, Deiva Magan and Yaadon Ki Baaraat. Rao described it as a "modern version of the old folk tale of a king, queen and their quadruplets who grow up in different households".

Soundtrack 
The soundtrack was composed by Ilaiyaraaja. Vaali wrote the lyrics for all songs except "Kadha Kelu Kadha Kelu" and "Sundhari Neeyum Sundharan Njanum", which Panchu Arunachalam wrote. "Sundhari Neeyum Sundharan Njanum" was conceived out of Haasan's desire for a song like "Margazhi Thingal" (a verse from the devotional poem Thiruppavai) to feature in the film. K. J. Yesudas was supposed to sing the song, but due to his busy schedule Ilaiyaraaja insisted on Haasan singing it. The Malayalam lyrics in the song were written by Poovachal Khader. The song is set in the Carnatic raga known as Kedaram.

"Vechalum Vekkama Ponnalum" was inspired by the Thirukkural. While writing the lyrics, Vaali made every syllable have a stress as instructed by Ilaiyaraaja. "Siva Rathiri" is set in Natabhairavi, and "Mathapoovu Oru Penna" is set in Malgunji, a Hindustani raga. The songs "Mathapoovu Oru Penna" and "Aadi Pattam Thedi" were not picturised. For the Telugu-dubbed version Michael Madana Kamaraju, Rajasri wrote all the lyrics. "Vechalum Vekkama Ponnalum" was later recreated by Ilaiyaraaja's son Yuvan Shankar Raja for Dikkiloona (2021). "Rum Bum Bum Arambum" was recreated by Yuvan for Coffee with Kadhal (2022).

Release and reception 
Michael Madana Kama Rajan was released on 17 October 1990, Diwali day. Julie of Kalki liked Haasan's performance as Kameshwaran the most among the quadruplets, but criticised the climax for its length. The film was commercially successful and ran for 175 days, thereby becoming a silver jubilee film.

References

Bibliography

External links 
 

1990 comedy films
1990 films
1990s Tamil-language films
Counterfeit money in film
Films directed by Singeetam Srinivasa Rao
Films scored by Ilaiyaraaja
Films shot in Bangalore
Films with screenplays by Crazy Mohan
Films with screenplays by Kamal Haasan
Indian comedy films
Indian remakes of Pakistani films